The 2016 Howard Bison football team represented Howard University in the 2016 NCAA Division I FCS football season. They were led by fifth-year head coach Gary Harrell. The Bison played their home games at William H. Greene Stadium. They were a member of the Mid-Eastern Athletic Conference (MEAC). They finished the season 2–9, 2–6 in MEAC play to finish in tenth place.

On November 23, it was announced that head coach Gary Harrell's contract would not be renewed. He finished at Howard with a five-year record of 20–36.

Schedule

Game summaries

at Maryland

at Rutgers

vs. Hampton

at Morgan State

at Norfolk State

Monmouth

South Carolina State

North Carolina A&T

at Savannah State

at North Carolina Central

Delaware State

References

Howard
Howard Bison football seasons
Howard Bison football